The 2018 Tour du Haut Var was the 50th edition of the Tour du Haut Var cycle race and was held on 17–18 February 2018. The race started in Le Cannet-des-Maures and finished in Flayosc. The race was won by Jonathan Hivert.

General classification

References

2018
2018 UCI Europe Tour
2018 in French sport